Trundy Island is an island 0.4 nautical miles (0.7 km) west-northwest of Robbins Island in the west part of Joubin Islands. Named by Advisory Committee on Antarctic Names (US-ACAN) for George B. Trundy, Able Seaman in the R.V. Hero in her first voyage to Antarctica and nearby Palmer Station in 1968.

See also 
 List of Antarctic and sub-Antarctic islands

References 

Islands of the Palmer Archipelago